Iman Mohamad Jodeh is an American politician serving as a Democratic member of the Colorado House of Representatives from the 41st district. Elected in 2020, she is the first Muslim elected to the legislature and assumed office on January 13, 2021.

Early life and education 
Jodeh was born in Denver, the daughter of Palestinian parents who immigrated to the United States in 1974. She grew up in neighboring Aurora, and graduated from Overland High School. She earned a Bachelor of Arts in political science and history in 2004 and Master of Public Policy from University of Colorado Denver in 2006.

Career 
Jodeh has worked as a community liaison for the Interfaith Alliance of Colorado. In 2008, she founded Meet the Middle East, a non-profit whose mission is to bridge understanding between Americans and what she says is the "most misunderstood region of the world."

Colorado House of Representatives
A member of the Democratic Party, she was elected to represent the 41st district in the Colorado House of Representatives in the 2020 general election, and is the first Muslim lawmaker in the state's history. The district includes part of Aurora in Arapahoe County. In the election, she defeated her Republican opponent, winning 65.86% of the vote.  During the 2021 legislative session, Jodeh co-sponsored a healthcare bill (Colorado Option) that would later be passed aimed at creating affordable standardized health insurance. Jodeh sponsored a successful bill that created the Colorado Office of New Americans within the Colorado’s Department of Labor and Employment. The office's stated purpose is to help immigrants and new residents integrate into their new communities and function as a resource for state leaders and community members.

In the 2022 Colorado House of Representatives election, Jodeh was re-elected to represent the 41st district. On November 12, 2022, Jodeh was selected as majority co-whip of the state House.

Jodeh's political policies include working on access to healthcare (including mental health), jobs, protecting civil rights, affordable housing, and education.

References

External links 

 Campaign website

American politicians of Palestinian descent
21st-century American women politicians
Democratic Party members of the Colorado House of Representatives
Living people
Year of birth missing (living people)
People from Aurora, Colorado
American Muslims
University of Colorado Denver alumni
Women state legislators in Colorado
Palestinian Muslims
21st-century American politicians